Bejinariu is a Romanian surname. Notable people with the surname include:

Eugen Bejinariu (born 1959), Romanian politician
Viviana Iuliana Bejinariu (born 1994), Romanian rower

Romanian-language surnames